Daniel Łukasik (born 28 April 1991) is a Polish footballer who plays as a defensive midfielder for Ekstraklasa side Radomiak Radom.

His debut in Legia's shirt took place on 24 September 2011 in the game against GKS Bełchatów. On 17 June 2014 he joined Lechia Gdańsk.

International career

International goals
Scores and results list Poland's goal tally first.

Honours
Lechia Gdańsk
Polish Cup: 2018–19
Polish Super Cup: 2019

References

External links
 
 

People from Giżycko
1991 births
Living people
Legia Warsaw players
Legia Warsaw II players
Lechia Gdańsk players
SV Sandhausen players
MKE Ankaragücü footballers
Radomiak Radom players
Polish footballers
Ekstraklasa players
III liga players
2. Bundesliga players
Süper Lig players
Polish expatriate footballers
Expatriate footballers in Germany
Expatriate footballers in Turkey
Polish expatriate sportspeople in Germany
Polish expatriate sportspeople in Turkey
Sportspeople from Warmian-Masurian Voivodeship
Association football midfielders
Poland under-21 international footballers
Poland international footballers